On the Count of Three is a 2021 American dark comedy-drama film directed by Jerrod Carmichael (in his feature directorial debut) and written by Ari Katcher and Ryan Welch. It stars Carmichael and Christopher Abbott as two best friends who make a suicide pact and have one final day to take care of unfinished business. Tiffany Haddish, J. B. Smoove, Lavell Crawford, and Henry Winkler also star.

On the Count of Three had its world premiere at the 2021 Sundance Film Festival, and was released in select theaters and on-demand by United Artists Releasing (through Annapurna Pictures and Orion Pictures) on May 13, 2022. It received generally positive reviews.

Plot
Despite being offered a promotion, depressed mulch factory worker Val tries to commit suicide in a toilet stall at work, but stops when his annoying co-worker enters the restroom while singing "It's a Great Day to Be Alive" to himself. Val breaks up with his girlfriend Natasha and quits his job, then helps his best friend Kevin escape from the psychiatric hospital where he was placed after he had also tried to commit suicide three days earlier. Val tells Kevin that suicide is the answer, despite what people are taught, and the two agree to simultaneously shoot each other in the face. Kevin panics and smacks Val's hand away when Val pulls the trigger, then convinces Val that they should at least celebrate their last day of life. While the two eat at a diner and discuss what to do with their final day, Kevin's former school bully walks in with his wife and child and joyfully reminisces about severely injuring him.

Kevin's main goal is to kill Dr. Brenner, the child psychiatrist who molested him. However, when a receptionist tells Val and Kevin that Brenner does not arrive to work until late in the afternoon, they decide to return to his workplace later. Val learns that Natasha is pregnant, and tells Kevin that he had planned to marry her but backed out because he was scared. Val and Kevin ride dirt bikes at a motorcycle park owned by their friend Donny, but Val falls off his bike and cuts his leg open. Kevin aims his gun at a rude gas station attendant who makes him wait to buy medical supplies for Val, but he insists that he is using the gun to send a message rather than rob the station and pays for the supplies before leaving. Val visits his father Lyndell at his car workshop and tries to retrieve the money Lyndell had stolen from him when he was younger, causing a fistfight which ends when Kevin hits Lyndell with a tire iron and Val takes the money. Val goes to the jewelry store where he bought the ring for Natasha and returns it. He visits Natasha and tries to give her money to support her, but she criticizes him and encourages him to see a therapist. In the meantime, Kevin goes for a drive. He sees his former school bully and contemplates killing him, but changes his mind after watching him play with his daughter.

Late in the afternoon, Kevin goes through with his plan and visits Brenner. He forces Brenner to get on his knees and tries to shoot him, but forgets to take the safety off. Brenner hits Kevin and takes the gun away from him, then lectures him for forgetting about the safety. Val arrives and sees Brenner waving the gun at an injured Kevin; mistakenly thinking Brenner is about to shoot Kevin, he shoots Brenner in the head. In the car, Val tells Kevin that he does not want to die and that he would rather live so he can be there for his child. Attempting to escape a police chase, the two visit Donny and give him the keys to Val's car before riding away on dirt bikes while the police are distracted by Donny. Val and Kevin are spotted by police helicopters and decide to stop running away. Kevin tries to convince Val that suicide is still the answer to their problems, but Val does not change his mind about wanting to live. Kevin tells Val to blame Brenner's murder on him, then shoots himself in the head. A few years later, Val receives a Father's Day visit in prison from Natasha and their daughter.

Cast
 Jerrod Carmichael as Val
 Christopher Abbott as Kevin
 Tiffany Haddish as Natasha
 Lavell Crawford as Donny
 J. B. Smoove as Lyndell
 Henry Winkler as Dr. Brenner
 Ryan McDonald as Brian
 Jared Abrahamson as Wyatt

Production
In June 2019, it was announced that Jerrod Carmichael and Christopher Abbott would star in the film and that Carmichael would make his directorial debut from a screenplay by Ari Katcher and Ryan Welch. In November, it was announced that Tiffany Haddish, Henry Winkler, J. B. Smoove, and Lavell Crawford had joined the cast. David Carrico and Adam Paulsen agreed to produce under their Valparaiso Pictures banner, alongside Tom Werner serving as a producer under his Werner Entertainment banner. Principal photography commencing that same month.

Release
The film had its world premiere at the 2021 Sundance Film Festival, where Katcher and Welch were awarded the Waldo Salt Screenwriting Award. Shortly after, Annapurna Pictures and MGM's Orion Pictures acquired U.S. distribution rights to the film, which was released through their joint venture United Artists Releasing. The film's first trailer was released on April 27, 2022, beginning with a slate promoting the National Suicide Prevention Lifeline. It received a limited theatrical release and a digital release on May 13, 2022. It was also released on the streaming service Hulu and labeled as part of their "Hulu Originals" on August 17.

Reception

Box office 
In the United States and Canada, the film earned $36,822 from 19 theaters in its opening weekend. It ultimately grossed between $62,131 and $62,155 at the worldwide box office.

Critical response 
On Rotten Tomatoes, the film holds an approval rating of 85% based on 114 reviews, with an average rating of 7.1/10. The website's critics consensus reads, "It's occasionally uneven, but On the Count of Three finds director/star Jerrod Carmichael attempting an ambitious blend of drama and dark comedyand often succeeding." 

David Ehrlich of IndieWire gave the film an A− and wrote, "Like a game of Russian roulette, this is a movie that would have seemed embarrassingly stupid if things had gone wrong. It's a dangerous and somehow enjoyable movie that dances around the edge of an open wound from start to finish as it risks making light of the heaviest things that so many of its viewers will ever have to carry. But it's exhilaratinga little at first, and then a hell of a lotto see these characters find the kind of happiness worth dying for." Benjamin Lee of The Guardian gave the film 3/5 stars and said, "While it's ultimately a little too messy to work quite as well as it could have, given the interesting and ambitious ingredients, On the Count of Three is proof that Carmichael is a director to be excited about, hoping that perhaps he finds time to write his next script himself."

Accolades

References

External links

 
 On the Count of Three on Hulu
 On the Count of Three at MGM Studios
 On the Count of Three at Annapurna Pictures
 
 

American black comedy films
American thriller films
American independent films
American buddy comedy-drama films
2020s buddy comedy-drama films
2021 comedy films
2021 thriller films
2021 independent films
Films about depression
Films about suicide
Orion Pictures films
Annapurna Pictures films
Sundance Film Festival award winners
2020s English-language films
2020s American films
United Artists films
Hulu original films
Films about child abuse
Films about mental health